Medical Grade Music (2021) is an autobiographical book written by former English snooker player Steve Davis and Iranian-born musician Kavus Torabi. It focuses on the duo's shared affinity for psychedelic and progressive music. It also serves as a tribute to the late radio presenter John Peel.

Critical reception 
The book received mostly positive reviews. Paul Stevens of Louder Than War called the book "a great primer on music that falls outside of the Great Punk Rock War narrative and reveals a golden musical seam among the greatcoats, gloom and grease of the early 1970s" and complimented the contrast of Davis and Torabi's perspectives.

References 

2021 books
Music autobiographies
John Peel